Christoph Spering (23 June 1959 in Simmern) is a German conductor of classical music, especially church music. He founded in 1985 the choir Chorus Musicus Köln and in 1988 the orchestra Das Neue Orchester (The new orchestra).

Selected recordings 
 Gioachino Rossini: Stabat Mater
 Wolfgang Amadeus Mozart: Requiem
 Luigi Cherubini: Les deux journées
 Felix Mendelssohn: Athalia
 Antonio Salieri: La passione di Gesù Cristo
 Antonio Casimir Cartellieri: La celebre Natività del Redentore
 Franz Schubert: Die Verschworenen
 Ludwig van Beethoven: Christus am Ölberge
 Josef Mysliveček: La Passione di Nostro Signore Gesù Cristo
 : Symphonies No. 5 and 7
 Gluck/Wagner: Iphigenie in Aulis
 Jean-François Lesueur: Coronation oratorios
 Robert Schumann: Der Rose Pilgerfahrt

External links 
 
 Christoph Spering Musikforum Köln, Juli 2011
 Christoph Spering · Chorus Musicus Köln · Das Neue Orchester Musikforum Kölnam

German male conductors (music)
1959 births
Living people
21st-century German conductors (music)
21st-century German male musicians
Kirchenmusikdirektor